The Performers may refer to:
The Performers (play), 2012 play
The Performers (TV series), 1972 Canadian TV show
The Performers (花と涙と炎), 1970 Japanese film directed by Umetsugu Inoue

See also
Performer (disambiguation)